Here & There – S.E.S. Singles Collection is a compilation album in Japanese released in 2001 by S.E.S. under the record label VAP.

Single
"Lovin’ You" was the first and only promotional single from the album. Released August 2, 2000, it was S.E.S.'s seventh and last full Japanese single. It has sold approximately 3,000 copies. It was accompanied by a single EP, containing remixes and instrumentals.

Track listing

 Lovin' You 
 Love Is...Day By Day (4:34)
 Lovin' You (Opus Mix) (4:30)
 Lovin' You (Muse Mix) (4:58)
 Lovin' You (Instrumental) (4:51)
 Love Is...Day By Day (Instrumental) (4:34)

Track listing
 めぐりあう世界 (4:59)
 Believe in Love (5:15)
 夢をかさねて (More Boost Mix) (5:09)
 Lovin You (Opus Mix) (4:29)
 (愛)という名の誇り (Single Version) (5:20)
 Unh~Happy Day (5:14)
 T.O.P. -Twinkling Of Paradise- (Masters Funk Remix) (4:54)
 Love is..day by day (4:35)
 Sign Of Love (DJ Tavouret Clubmix) (6:15)
 Round & Round (4:09)
 海のオーロラ (Blizzard Mix) (5:44)
 Lovin' You (4:51)
 めぐりあう世界 (Miami DJ Mix) (5:17)

External links 
  S.E.S.' Official Site
  SM Entertainment's Official Site

2001 compilation albums
S.E.S. (group) albums